Crofthandy is a hamlet in the parish of Gwennap, Cornwall, England.

References

Hamlets in Cornwall